Federico Martin Molinari (born 11 January 1984) is an Argentine male artistic gymnast and part of the national team.  He participated at the 2012 Summer Olympics in London, United Kingdom.

References

1984 births
Living people
Argentine male artistic gymnasts
Gymnasts at the 2012 Summer Olympics
Olympic gymnasts of Argentina
Place of birth missing (living people)
Gymnasts at the 2007 Pan American Games
Gymnasts at the 2015 Pan American Games
Gymnasts at the 2019 Pan American Games
Originators of elements in artistic gymnastics
Pan American Games medalists in gymnastics
Pan American Games bronze medalists for Argentina
South American Games silver medalists for Argentina
South American Games bronze medalists for Argentina
South American Games medalists in gymnastics
Competitors at the 2002 South American Games
Competitors at the 2006 South American Games
Competitors at the 2010 South American Games
Competitors at the 2014 South American Games
Competitors at the 2018 South American Games
Medalists at the 2019 Pan American Games
21st-century Argentine people